In 1798, the Northwest Territory became eligible to send a non-voting delegate to the U.S. Congress.
The Assembly elected this representative.

List of delegates representing the district 

The Northwest Territory was reduced to the size of Ohio when the Indiana Territory was created on July 4, 1800. The Northwest Territory went out of existence when Ohio was admitted as a state on March 1, 1803.

See also
 Illinois Territory's at-large congressional district
 Indiana Territory's at-large congressional district
 Michigan Territory's at-large congressional district
 Wisconsin Territory's at-large congressional district
 Minnesota Territory's at-large congressional district

References 

 

Congressional districts of Ohio
At-large United States congressional districts
Former congressional districts of the United States
Constituencies established in 1799
Constituencies disestablished in 1803
1799 establishments in the Northwest Territory
1803 disestablishments in the Northwest Territory